The Japan Airlines Open was a professional golf tournament in Japan in the early 1970s. The event was founded in 1971.

The first event was held at the Fuchu Country Club near Tokyo, Japan. Tony Jacklin, David Graham, and Graham Marsh played in the event. David Graham was four shots back entering the final round but shot a "nearly flawless" 68 (−4) and wound up tied with Masashi "Jumbo" Ozaki at the end of regulation. Graham and Ozaki then competed in a 3-hole playoff; both remained tied at the end of it. They then competed in a sudden-death playoff. They were still tied after the first two holes of sudden death. On the third sudden-death playoff hole (and 6th overall) Graham made a tap-in birdie before Ozaki missed an 8-foot birdie putt.

The second event was held at Narashino Country Club in Inzai, Japan. Gary Player, Graham Marsh, and Peter Thomson were among the 88 competitors. Player won the event, getting up and down from a bunker on the final hole to secure the win.

Winners

References 

Defunct golf tournaments in Japan
Recurring sporting events established in 1971
Recurring sporting events disestablished in 1972
1971 establishments in Japan
1972 disestablishments in Japan